Saints Celsa and Nona are Christian saints of whom little is known. They were virgins of Brabant, whose bodies were found near that of Saint Berlinda.  Their feast day is 3 February.

References

External links
3 February saints at Patron Saints Index
3 February saints at Saint Patrick's Church

Christian saints in unknown century
Belgian Roman Catholic saints
Year of birth unknown